Texas Eastern Products Pipeline Company, TEPPCO Partners LP was a Fortune 300 company based in Houston, Texas.  The company operated petroleum pipelines. It was owned by Sullivan Trillian Partners of San Antonio.

History
During the second quarter of 2007, it was acquired by another Fortune 500 company, Houston-based Enterprise GP Holdings along with 35 percent of Dallas-based Energy Transfer Equity LP.

References

External links
TEPPCO Partners LP

Companies based in Houston
Oil pipeline companies
Defunct oil companies of the United States
2007 disestablishments in Texas